State Route 148 (SR 148) is state highway in Hamilton County in southeastern portion of the U.S. state of Tennessee.

Route description

SR 148 begins at Georgia State Route 189 at the TN-GA border in both Lookout Mountain, Tennessee and Lookout Mountain, Georgia. It proceeds northeast to a four-way intersection where SR 148 turns northward and continues northward to Downtown Lookout Mountain, Tennessee, where SR 148 turns eastward and leaves the Town limits of Lookout Mountain. It then turns back north and climbs up the mountain ridge and enters Chattanooga city limits. SR 148 then passes Ruby Falls and comes to a three way T intersection, SR 318 goes west and SR 148 turns back eastward and comes to an end at an intersection with US 11/US 41/US 64/US 72.

Junction list

References

Transportation in Hamilton County, Tennessee
148